Keezer See is a lake in the Ludwigslust-Parchim district in Mecklenburg-Vorpommern, Germany. At an elevation of 22.6 m, its surface area is 1.17 km².

Lakes of Mecklenburg-Western Pomerania